Jacob Schriever (12 April 1903 – 22 April 1964) was a Dutch fencer. He competed in the team sabre event at the 1936 Summer Olympics.

References

1903 births
1964 deaths
Dutch male fencers
Olympic fencers of the Netherlands
Fencers at the 1936 Summer Olympics
Sportspeople from Utrecht (city)
20th-century Dutch people